There were three Santer-Poos Ministries:

 Santer-Poos Ministry I
 Santer-Poos Ministry II
 Santer-Poos Ministry III